Chatouane District is a district of Tlemcen Province in northwestern Algeria.

Districts of Tlemcen Province